645AR is a rapper based in Atlanta, Georgia. Best known for his use of a high-pitched voice, definitive of the hip hop style dubbed "squeak rap", he has released singles with artists such as Danny Brown, Tyga, FKA Twigs, Tony Shhnow, BabyTron, Tommy Cash, Valee, and Dorian Electra. 645AR first started breaking through after the viral success of his 2018 single "Crack", then fully broke with the next year's "4 da Trap". He subsequently signed with Columbia Records.

Life and career 
Austin Alan Rochez was born in the South Bronx region of New York City. At age 11, he moved with his family to the Southern United States, living in Florida for about a year before settling in Smyrna, Georgia, a city just outside of Atlanta. While there, he made connections with local rappers such as Lil Yachty through his friendships with JWitDaBeam and Slimesito. He returned to New York in 2016 to attend Hostos Community College, playing basketball for the school's team, but his interest in music led him to return to Atlanta where the hip hop scene had been heating up with the advent of trap's rise in popularity. The numbers in his name came from his building number in the Bronx, while the letters are his first and last initials.

With a few songs under his belt, Rochez realized he needed a way to stand out. He first employed his signature squeaky voice in the 2018 single "Crack". The song garnered attention when its video was reposted by fellow New Yorker Lil Tecca, including from the music industry. This led to the release of his self-titled debut album in 2019, and the single "4 da Trap" later in the year. "4 da Trap" spread virally across the internet, even leading Twitter to suspend 645AR's account because they assumed it was spam. The momentum led the rapper to sign a record deal with Columbia Records.

Style and reception 
645AR is best known for popularizing the hip hop subgenre known as "squeak rap". Building off of the experimental vocal styles of rappers such as Future, Playboi Carti, and Young Thug, (645AR himself has stated that he's heard comparisons of his work to Carti, Thug, and hyperpop duo 100 Gecs.) squeaking revolves around high-pitched vocalizations delivered through an "otherworldly curvature of the voice". Said vocal distortions are said to replace lyrics in delivering the meaning of songs, with said lyrics becoming "virtually indecipherable". Other names for the style include "baby voice rap", "chipmunk rap", and "fetus vocal rap". 645AR has said he intends for his music to make listeners have out-of-body experiences, "like they're in another world." Though often suspected of being achieved artificially with tools such as pitch correction, 645AR has stated that his squeak is entirely natural and even demonstrated it live in a video for Genius. His natural voice is a baritone. Dr. Calbert Graham of the University of Cambridge Language Sciences Centre said 645AR's voice sounded like a human synthesizer, and that it sounded like he was tensing his thyrohyoid muscle to achieve his falsetto. Graham said he "wouldn't imagine a musician would say that's the proper way of producing a falsetto", calling it innovative and saying 645AR is "testing the boundaries of what constitutes rap".

Squeak rap is often described as a musical internet meme, something which 645AR is noted as embracing, up to and including a video the artist made in which he jokingly claims that his voice originated from having been possessed by Mickey Mouse. He is also frequently compared to fictional characters with high-pitched voices such as Mickey Mouse, Alvin and the Chipmunks, Elmo, and Isabelle from the video game series Animal Crossing, as well as animals such as mosquitos, mice, and bedbugs. Despite this, 645AR is also considered to be sincere about his work, saying he finds his lyrics to be important and that he takes more time writing them than other artists. He is said to speak "to the streets with harrowing tales".

645AR's style has been compared to hyperpop with the rapper even being outright called a hyperpop artist. He has made songs with hyperpop artists such as Dorian Electra, Isomonstrosity, and Umru. The latter song was featured on hyperpop pioneer record label PC Music's compilation album PC Music, Vol. 3.

Multiple artists have had their own use of falsetto compared to 645AR, such as Adam Levine, Baby Keem, FKA Twigs, and Fousheé.

Influences 
While growing up in the Bronx, 645AR listened to New York rappers 50 Cent and Jay-Z. After moving south, he incorporated Southern rappers T-Pain and Lil Wayne into his listening.

Discography

Albums 
 645AR (2019, self-released)

Mixtapes 
 96 Problemz (2017)
 Fix da Rap Game (2018)
 SOS 5 (2018)
 Sink or Swim (2022)

EPs 
 Sink or Swim (2017)
 Stack or Starve (2018)
 S.O.S III (2018)
 S.O.S IV (2018)
 Get Rich or Die Drowning (2018, with 10kDunkin and JWitDaBeam)
 2 Train 2 Foreigns (2018)
 Rags 2 Expensive Rags (2019)
 2 Train 2 Foreigns 2 (2019)
 No Label (2020)
 Most Hated (2021)
 Unorthodox (2022, with SenseiATL)
 New Beginnings (2022, with Lil Crank)
 Unstoppable (2022)

Singles

References 

Living people
21st-century American rappers
American male rappers
Rappers from the Bronx
Rappers from Atlanta
Columbia Records artists
People from Smyrna, Georgia
Hostos Community College alumni
Hyperpop musicians